George Bures Miller (born 1960) is a Canadian artist noted for his collaborative works with his wife Janet Cardiff. Miller and Cardiff represented Canada at the 2001 Venice Biennale. They are based in British Columbia, Canada.

Solo works

Works with Janet Cardiff

Bures Miller and Cardiff represented Canada at the 49th Venice Biennale with Paradise Institute (2001), a 16-seat movie theatre where viewers watched a film, becoming entangled as witnesses to a possible crime played out in the real world audience and on the screen. The artists won La Biennale di Venezia Special Award at Venice, presented to Canadian artists for the first time and the Benesse Prize, recognizing artists who break new artistic ground with an experimental and pioneering spirit. Cardiff and Bures Miller have recently had exhibitions at Fraenkel Gallery, San Francisco (2018), Modern Art Oxford (2008), the Fruitmarket Gallery, Edinburgh, Scotland (2008) Vancouver Art Gallery (2005), Luhring Augustine, New York (2004), Contemporary Arts Center, Cincinnati (2003), Art Gallery of Ontario (2002), National Gallery of Canada (2002) and Oakville Galleries, Oakville, Ontario (2000).

Publications

 Cardiff, Janet and George Bures Miller. The Killing Machine and Other stories 1995 - 2007. Texts by Ralph Beil and Bartomeo Mari and other authors. MACBA Barcelona and Mathildenhohe Darmstadt, 2007. 
 Cardiff, Janet and George Bures Miller. Janet Cardiff & George Bures Miller: Louisiana Contemporary. Michael Juul Holm and Mette Marcus (eds). Louisiana Museum of Modern Art, Denmark, 2006. 
 Cardiff, Janet and George Bures Miller. The Secret Hotel. Janet Cardiff + George Bures Miller. Kunsthaus Bregenz and Eckgard Schneider (eds). Buchhandlung Walther Koenig, 2005. 
 Cardiff, Janet and George Bures Miller. Janet Cardiff & George Bures Miller – Venice Biennial – The Paradise Institute. Texts by Wayne Baerwald. Buchhandlung Walther Koenig, 2001. 
 Miller, George Bures. George Bures Miller – Simple Experiments in Aerodynamics: 6 & 7. Texts by Wayne Baerwaldt & Dana Samuel. Toronto: Mercer Union, A Centre for Contemporary Art, 2001.

References

General references
 Smith, Roberta. "Janet Cardiff and George Bures Miller." The New York Times (March 2004): E33.

External links
 Janet Cardiff and George Bures Miller official website
 George Bures Miller at Ontario College of Art & Design alumni
 Whitechapel Art Gallery Review, London, By Greg Whitfield

Artists from Alberta
Canadian installation artists
1960 births
Living people
OCAD University alumni
Canadian contemporary artists
People from Vegreville